Kalamandalam Bindhulekha  is a mural painter and Mohiniyattam, Bharathanatyam dancer from Kerala state, India. She is the first woman mural painter in temple drawing from Kerala state.

Early life and background
Kalamandalam Bindhulekha is a diploma holder in Mohiniyattam and Bharathanatyam and has graduated from Kerala Kalamandalam. She took up mural painting, after having been attracted by the work of her brother-in-law, Sadanandan, a disciple of Mammiyur Krishnan Kutty Nair and was trained in the genre for six years.

Art career
Her debut work in Tiroor Vadakurumbakaavu temple in Thrissur is considered the first mural painting to be done in a Kerala temple by a woman artist. It took two years to complete the mural painting which consisted of three forms of Devi - Saraswati (in shades of white), Bhadrakali (in shades of dark blue) and Mahalakshmi (in shades of red). The painting was based on the theme "Rajas tamas satva".

References

1978 births
21st-century Indian painters
Painters from Kerala
Malayali people
Living people
Indian women painters
Women muralists
Indian women contemporary artists
Indian contemporary painters
21st-century Indian women artists
Mohiniyattam exponents
Bharatanatyam exponents
Indian female classical dancers
Performers of Indian classical dance
People from Thrissur district
Dancers from Kerala
Women artists from Kerala
Indian muralists
20th-century Indian women
20th-century Indian painters